Austin Zajur (born August 12, 1995) is an American actor known for his roles in films such as Scary Stories to Tell in the Dark and Fist Fight, and television shows such as Kidding and Point of Honor.

Early and personal life 
Zajur was born on August 12, 1995 in the United States. His father Michel Zajur was born in Mexico, to a family of Lebanese-Syrian descent. His father is also the president and CEO of the Virginia Hispanic Chamber of Commerce.

Since 2019, Zajur is in a relationship with actress Harley Quinn Smith.

Filmography

Film

Television

Web

References

External links 

 

Living people
American male film actors
American male television actors
21st-century American male actors
American people of Mexican descent
American people of Arab descent
American people of Lebanese descent
American people of Syrian descent

1995 births